Nav-e Pain (also Romanized as Nāv-e Pā’īn) is a village in Kharajgil Rural District, Asalem District, Talesh County, Gilan Province, Iran. At the 2006 census, its population was 1,643, in 380 families.

References 

Populated places in Talesh County